Sarata may refer to:

Sarata, a town in Tatarbunary Raion, Odessa Oblast
 Sarata Raion (Ukrainian: Саратський район), a raion located in the Odessa Oblast of Ukraine, with its administrative center is the town of Sarata
 Sarata River, a river in Ukraine and Moldova
 Sarata-Drăgușeni, a village in Botoșani County, Romania
  (born 1942), Austrian opera singer
 Sarata (moth), a moth genus in the family Pyralidae

See also 
 Sărata (disambiguation)